Ram Lakhan Prasad Gupta (1926-1985)  was a leader of Bharatiya Janata Party from Bihar. He was a member of Rajya Sabha for the periods of 1970 -76 and 1978-84. He was also a member of Bihar Legislative Council and  served as state president of Bihar unit of Bharatiya Jan Sangh.

References

1926 births
1985 deaths
Members of the Bihar Legislative Council
Gupta Ram Lakahn Prasad
Bharatiya Jana Sangh politicians
Rajya Sabha members from the Bharatiya Janata Party
Bharatiya Janata Party politicians from Bihar